City of Glass is the third book in the urban fantasy series  The Mortal Instruments by Cassandra Clare. In 2009, Walker Books published the third book of the series worldwide. It is a journey that explores Simon's and Clary's experience in the Shadowhunter city, and Clary works on saving her mother, as they travel from New York institute to Alicante, Idris.

Plot
Clary is at Luke's house with Simon packing for her trip to Idris, in which both of them have conversations based on Clary's goal to save her mother, and the struggle she will face when she reaches Idris. Jace persuades Simon to lie and say that Clary decided not to go to Idris, in order to protect her from the Clave, who he feels will try to turn her into a weapon. When Clary visits the Institute, Magnus tells her that the Lightwoods had to travel through the portal, due to an attack by Forsaken. During the battle, Simon is injured and Jace takes him to Idris to save his life. With her power to create runes, Clary is able to create a portal and she travels with Luke through the portal.

As Simon wakes up to realize that he was pulled through the portal and now is in Alicante, he realizes the truth behind Jace's motivation to not make Clary come to Idris. Later at the Lightwood house, he meets Sebastian Verlac and Aline Penhallow. Over time, Alec comes back from the Clave meeting to tell Simon that he will be sent back to New York by Aldertree, the new Inquisitor. When Simon arrives to leave for home, it is revealed as a trap to bring people back to the Clave's trust and he is imprisoned and is questioned on his new ability to walk in daylight as a vampire. After the questioning, he befriends a fellow mate named Samuel Blackburn.

After Clary opens the portal and goes through it, she falls into Lake Lyn and Luke is able to save her, but as she comes out, she starts to hallucinate as the lake is revealed to be harmful to the Nephilim. Luke decides to take her to his sister, Amatis, where after treatment she wakes up in a bedroom to meet Amatis and is warned that she is not allowed to see Jace. Even with such risk, she sneaks out to find Jace and finds him in the Lightwood house library, kissing Aline. After seeing this Clary runs away. After a while, Sebastian joins Clary and drops her back to Amatis's home, who is disappointed at her actions.

Later, Alec finds out that Simon never made it back home and is imprisoned in Alicante, and at night Jace goes to visit Simon and save him, but Simon refuses to escape, because it would shine suspicions on the Lightwoods. The next morning in Simon's cell he finds that Isabelle has left blood for him. Raphael visits Simon and informs him that he is now being hunted by every Downworlder, because of his Daylighter powers. In the morning, Clary is woken up by Sebastian to find Ragnor Fell, but instead they find Magnus who tells them that Fell is dead. Magnus froze Sebastian to inform him where to find a cure to save Clary's mother with the Book of White. With this, Clary travels her way back and in between the journey Sebastian kisses Clary despite Clary finding it wrong. When Clary returns she informs Jace that they need the Book of White and they set off on a journey to find it. Clary draws a portal to Wayland Manor, where a trapped angel reveals that Clary received angel blood in the womb, and Jace received demon blood. They give a seraph blade to the angel, who then stabs himself. Both of them barely make it out alive outside of the manor right before it collapses, as it was tied to the life force of the angel. Jace and Clary confess their love for each other and have a heated kiss but Clary pulls back as she's not sure that Jace's feelings for her aren't just a result of demon blood in him and angel blood in her.

On their way back, they find out that Alicante is being attacked by demons and in the battle the youngest of the Lightwood family, Max, is killed by Sebastian. After the battle, Clary and Jace rescue Simon from the fire in prison and realized that his fellow prison mate was Hodge.  Sebastian appears and kills Hodge, after he reveals that Lake Lyn is the third mortal instrument.

After a few days, they have a funeral for the people who were killed in the attack. Later that day, Simon meets up with Isabelle to comfort her as Jace walks Clary back to Amatis's place. Later that night, Jace comes to Clary's place and sleeps in her bed with her and in the morning leaves a note. When Clary gets downstairs to save Jace from his mistake, she meets her mother, which she reacts to with anger. Later, her mother tells her the truth: Jace was raised by Valentine, but is not his biological son, but rather Sebastian is, and by extension Clary's brother. Clary runs to the Accord Hall to work out a plan to make both Shadowhunters and Downworlders fight together, and during the decision process, Jocelyn, Clary's mom, releases the truth, and in the end, the Clave decides that both can work together to fight the battle. This allows Clary to use her rune abilities to create an alliance rune that allows Downworlders and Shadowhunters to share their powers, that was first shown to her by the angel at Wayland Manor. All Downworlders agree to this but the vampires led by Raphael. He has a condition saying that the vampires will only fight if Clary hands over Simon to kill him. Clary comes up with a plan and draws a rune on Simon's forehead called the Mark of Cain. This protects Simon as anyone who tries to attack him will die and subsequently Raphael cannot kill him. Meanwhile Jace fights Sebastian and is about to die when Isabelle rescues him. Together, they kill Sebastian. Jace tracks down Valentine at Lake Lyn, where he is about to raise the Angel Raziel. He also finds Clary there, who Portaled there but was bound by Valentine. Valentine kills Jace, using his blood for the summoning. However, right before Valentine finishes the ritual, Clary erases the runes in the sand that symbolize his name and instead writes hers over them. The angel rises, but as Valentine is no longer the one who summons him, the Angel kills Valentine and grants Clary's wish to bring Jace back. The story ends with the confession of love between Jocelyn and Luke.

Character list
 Jace Morgenstern/Herondale/Lightwood/Wayland A Shadow hunter that is in conflict after finding out that Valentine Morgenstern was his father and Clary Fairchild is his sister. In this book, Jace is in a battle with himself, the certain choice and finding the truth.
 Clary Morgenstern/Fairchild: A gifted Shadow hunter, that is in a mission to cure her mother from her coma, and discovers many secrets on the way. Through the book it is displayed her gift works to save Alicante from Valentines attack.
 Isabelle Lightwood: Alec Lightwoods’ sister, and rebellious girl and a strong Shadowhunter. In this book, after losing Max Lightwood (the youngest sibling), she goes through a self-conflict on her true potential as a Shadowhunter.
 Alec Lightwood:  Jace’s parabatai and Isabelle Lightwood's brother, works to reveal his true self and sexuality as it goes against the Shadowhunter society and his family.
 Magnus Bane: A high warlock in New York that helps the Lightwoods and Clave.  In this book, Magnus works in a way to aid Alec's true self to the Clave and family.
 Simon Lewis: Clary's best friend that is a daylighter vampire (a vampire that is not burned by the sun), and becomes part of the Shadowhunter world.  
 Luke Garroway/Graymark: An friend of Jocelyn (Clary's mother), that aids to raise Clary, as a werewolf,  was a former Shadowhunter. In the book, he aids to protect Clary and aid her in her certain goals.
 Amatis Graymark: Luke's sister, that lives in Alicante. In this book she aids to protect Clary and aides to save her life when she fell into Lake Lyn and started to hallucinate.
 Sebastian Morgenstern: A mysterious Shadowhunter that comes into the Penhallow house, pretending to be Aline Penhallow's cousin. It is revealed in the book, that he is Clary's actual brother and the true plan that he has with Valentine.
 Jocelyn Fray/Fairchild/Morgenstern: Clary's mom who was awakened from a spell by the warlock Magnus Bane at the end of the book

References

External links
The Official Mortal Instruments Website

2009 American novels
American young adult novels
Contemporary fantasy novels
Cengage books
Margaret K. McElderry books